Rhacophorus turpes (common names: Htingnan flying frog, Htingnan whipping treefrog) is a species of frog in the family Rhacophoridae. It is endemic to northern Myanmar. Little is known about this species that is only known from the original collection in 1937–1939 by Ronald Kaulback.

Habitat
Rhacophorus turpes is probably an arboreal forest dweller.

Description
They are pale pinkish-brownish above, with black spots (in the male) or an indistinct darker path (the female). Skin is smooth above but strongly granulate upon the belly and the anal region. Fingers are half-webbed whereas the toes are fully webbed.

References

turpes
Amphibians of Myanmar
Endemic fauna of Myanmar
Amphibians described in 1940
Taxa named by Malcolm Arthur Smith
Taxonomy articles created by Polbot